Ugaritic is an extinct Northwest Semitic language, classified by some as a dialect of the Amorite language and so the only known Amorite dialect preserved in writing. It is known through the Ugaritic texts discovered by French archaeologists in 1929 at Ugarit, including several major literary texts, notably the Baal cycle. It has been used by scholars of the Hebrew Bible to clarify Biblical Hebrew texts and has revealed ways in which the cultures of ancient Israel and Judah found parallels in the neighboring cultures.

Ugaritic has been called "the greatest literary discovery from antiquity since the deciphering of the Egyptian hieroglyphs and Mesopotamian cuneiform".

Corpus
The Ugaritic language is attested in texts from the 14th through the 12th century BC. The city of Ugarit was destroyed roughly 1190 BC.

Literary texts discovered at Ugarit include the Legend of Keret, the legends of Danel, the Myth of Baal-Aliyan, and the Death of Baal. The latter two are also known collectively as the Baal Cycle. All reveal aspects of ancient Northwest Semitic religion.

Writing system

The Ugaritic alphabet is a cuneiform script used beginning in the 15th century BC. Like most Semitic scripts, it is an abjad, where each symbol stands for a consonant, leaving the reader to supply the appropriate vowel.

Although it appears similar to Mesopotamian cuneiform (whose writing techniques it borrowed), its symbols and symbol meanings are unrelated. It is the oldest example of the family of West Semitic scripts such as the Phoenician, Paleo-Hebrew, and Aramaic alphabets (including the Hebrew alphabet). The so-called "long alphabet" has 30 letters while the "short alphabet" has 22. Other languages (particularly Hurrian) were occasionally written in the Ugarit area, although not elsewhere.

Clay tablets written in Ugaritic provide the earliest evidence of both the Levantine ordering of the alphabet, which gave rise to the alphabetic order of the Hebrew, Greek, and Latin alphabets; and the South Semitic order, which gave rise to the order of the Ge'ez script. The script was written from left to right.

Phonology
Ugaritic had 28 consonantal phonemes (including two semivowels) and eight vowel phonemes (three short vowels and five long vowels): a ā i ī u ū ē ō. The phonemes ē and ō occur only as long vowels and are the result of monophthongization of the diphthongs аy and aw, respectively.

The following table shows Proto-Semitic phonemes and their correspondences among Ugaritic, Classical Arabic and Tiberian Hebrew:

Grammar

Ugaritic is an inflected language, and its grammatical features are highly similar to those found in Classical Arabic and Akkadian. It possesses two genders (masculine and feminine), three grammatical cases for nouns and adjectives (nominative, accusative, and genitive), three numbers (singular, dual, and plural), and verb aspects similar to those found in other Northwest Semitic languages. The word order for Ugaritic is verb–subject–object (VSO) and subject–object–verb (SOV), possessed–possessor (NG), and noun–adjective (NA). Ugaritic is considered a conservative Semitic language, since it retains most of the phonemes, the case system, and the word order of the ancestral Proto-Semitic language.

See also

Northwest Semitic languages
Central Semitic languages
Semitic languages
Proto-Semitic language

Notes

References

 (2 vols; originally in Spanish, translated by W. G. E. Watson).
 (Contains Latin-alphabet transliterations of the Ugaritic texts and facing translations in English.)

 Found at Google Scholar.

 P. 1-404.

 A more concise grammar.

Further reading
 Pardee, Dennis. “UGARITIC PROPER NOUNS”. In: Archiv Für Orientforschung 36/37 (1989): 390–513. UGARITIC PROPER NOUNS.
 Watson, Wilfred G.E. "From Hair to Heel: Ugaritic Terms for Parts of the Body". In:  Vol. LII (2015), pp. 323–364.
 Watson, Wilfred G.E. "Terms for Occupations, Professions and Social Classes in Ugaritic: An Etymological Study". In: Folia Orientalia Vol. LV (2018), pp. 307–378. DOI: 10.24425/for.2018.124688
 Watson, Wilfred G.E. "Terms for Textiles, Clothing, Hides, Wool and Accessories in Ugaritic: An Etymological Study". In: Aula Orientalis 36/2 (2018): 359-396. .
 Watson, Wilfred G. E.. "Ugaritic Military Terms in the Light of Comparative Linguistics". In: At the Dawn of History: Ancient Near Eastern Studies in Honour of J. N. Postgate. Edited by Yağmur Heffron, Adam Stone and Martin Worthington, University Park, USA: Penn State University Press, 2021. pp. 699-720. coaccess

External links
Ugarit and the Bible. An excerpt from an online introductory course on Ugaritic grammar (the Quartz Hill School of Theology's course noted in the links hereafter). Includes a cursory discussion on the relationship between Ugaritic and Old Testament/Hebrew Bible literature.
"El in the Ugaritic tablets" on the BBCi website gives many attributes of the Ugaritic creator and his consort Athirat.
Abstract of Mark Smith, The Origins of Biblical Monotheism: Israel's Polytheistic Background and the Ugaritic Text.
Unicode Chart.
RSTI. The Ras Shamra Tablet Inventory: an online catalog of inscribed objects from Ras Shamra-Ugarit produced at the Oriental Institute of the University of Chicago.

Languages attested from the 2nd millennium BC
Extinct languages of Asia
Languages of Syria
Northwest Semitic languages
 
Amorite language
Cuneiform